Jersey, officially the Bailiwick of Jersey, is an island country and self-governing British Crown Dependency near the coast of north-west France. The Bailiwick consists of the main island of Jersey and some surrounding uninhabited islands and rocks including Les Dirouilles, Les Écréhous, Les Minquiers, and Les Pierres de Lecq.

Jersey was part of the Duchy of Normandy, whose dukes became kings of England from 1066. After Normandy was lost by the kings of England in the 13th century, and the ducal title surrendered to France, Jersey remained loyal to the English Crown, though it never became part of the Kingdom of England.

Jersey is a self-governing parliamentary democracy under a constitutional monarchy, with its own financial, legal and judicial systems, and the power of self-determination. The island's relationship with the Crown is different from the other Crown Dependencies; the Lieutenant Governor represents the King there. Jersey is not part of the United Kingdom, and has an international identity separate from that of the UK, but the UK is constitutionally responsible for the defence of Jersey.

The island has a large financial services industry, which generates 40% of its GVA. British cultural influence on the island is evident in its use of English as the main language and Pound sterling as its primary currency. Additional British cultural similarities include: driving on the left, access to British television and newspapers, a school curriculum following that of England, and the popularity of British sports, including cricket. The island also has a strong Norman-French culture, such as its historic dialect of the Norman language, Jèrriais, being one of only two places in Normandy with government status for the language (the other being Guernsey), as well as the use of standard French in legal matters and officially in use as a government language, strong cultural ties to mainland Normandy as a part of the Normandy region, and place names with French or Norman origins. The island has very close cultural links with its neighbouring islands in the Bailiwick of Guernsey, and they share a good-natured rivalry. Jersey and its people have been described as a nation.

Name 

The Channel Islands are mentioned in the Antonine Itinerary as the following: Sarnia, Caesarea, Barsa, Silia and Andium, but Jersey cannot be identified specifically because none corresponds directly to the present names. The name  has been used as the Latin name for Jersey (also in its French version ) since William Camden's Britannia, and is used in titles of associations and institutions today.

Andium, Agna and Augia were used in antiquity.

The ending  denotes an island (as in Guernsey or Surtsey).

History 

Jersey has been an island for approximately 6,000 years. Humans have lived on the island since at least 12000 BCE, with evidence of habitation in the Palaeolithic period (La Cotte de St Brelade) and Neolithic dolmens, such as La Hougue Bie. Evidence of Bronze Age and early Iron Age settlements can be found in many locations around the island.

Archaeological evidence of Roman influence has been found, in particular at Les Landes. Christianity was brought to the island by migrants from Brittany in c. fifth - sixth century CE. In the sixth century, the island's patron saint Helier lived at the Hermitage on L'Islet (now Elizabeth Castle). Legend states that Helier was beheaded by raiders and subsequently lifted his head and walked to shore.

In the ninth century the island was raided by Vikings and in 933 it was annexed to Normandy by William Longsword. When Duke William the Conqueror became King of England in 1066, the island remained part of the Norman possessions. However, in 1204, when Normandy was finally returned to the French king, the island remained a possession of the English crown, though never incorporated into England.Traditionally it is said that Jersey's self-governance originates from the Constitutions of King John, however this is disputed. Nevertheless, the island continued to follow Norman customs and laws. The King also appointed a Bailiff and a Warden (now Lieutenant-Governor). The period of English rule was marked by wars between England and France, as such a military fortress was built at Mont Orgueil.

During the Tudor period, the split between the Church of England and the Vatican led to islanders adopting the Protestant religion. During the reign of Elizabeth, French refugees brought strict Calvinism to the island, which remained the common religion until 1617. In the late 16th century, islanders travelled across the North Atlantic to participate in the Newfoundland fisheries. In recognition for help given to him during his exile in Jersey in the 1640s, King Charles II of England gave Vice Admiral Sir George Carteret, bailiff and governor, a large grant of land in the American colonies in between the Hudson and Delaware rivers, which he promptly named New Jersey. It is now a state in the United States.

In 1769, the island suffered food supply shortages, leading an insurrection on 28 September known as the Corn Riots. The States met at Elizabeth Castle and decided to request help from the King. However, in 1771 the Crown demanded reforms to the island's governance, leading to the Code of 1771 and removed the powers of the Royal Court to make laws without the States. In 1781, during the American Wars of Independence, the island was invaded by a French force which captured St Helier, but was defeated by Major Peirson's army at the Battle of Jersey.

The 19th century saw the improvement of the road network under General Don, the construction of two railway lines, the improvement of transport links to England, and the construction of new piers and harbours in St Helier. This grew a tourism industry in the island and led to the immigration of thousands of English residents, leading to a cultural shift towards a more anglicised island culture. Island politics was divisively split between the conservative Laurel party and the progressive Rose party, as the lie of power shifted increasingly to the States from the Crown. In the 1850s, the French author Victor Hugo lived in Jersey, but was expelled for insulting the Queen, so he moved on to Guernsey.

During the Second World War, 6,500 Jersey residents were evacuated by their own choice to the UK out of a total population of 50,000.  Jersey was occupied by Germany from 1 July 1940 until 9 May 1945, when Germany surrendered. During this time the Germans constructed many fortifications using slave labour imported onto the island from many different countries occupied or at war with Germany. After 1944, supplies from France were interrupted by the D-Day landings, and food on the island became scarce. The SS Vega was sent to the island carrying Red Cross supplies and news of the success of the Allied advance in Europe. During the Nazi occupation, a resistance cell was created by communist activist Norman Le Brocq and the Jersey Communist Party, whose communist ideology of forming a 'United Front' led to the creation of the Jersey Democratic Movement. The Channel Islands were one of the last places in Europe to be liberated. 9 May is celebrated as the island's Liberation Day, where there are celebrations in Liberation Square. After Liberation, the States was reformed, becoming wholly democratically elected, and universal franchise was implemented. Since liberation, the island has grown in population and adopted new industries, especially the finance industry.

Politics 

Jersey is a Crown Dependency and is not part of the United Kingdom – it is officially part of the British Islands. As one of the Crown Dependencies, Jersey is autonomous and self-governing, with its own independent legal, administrative and fiscal systems. Jersey's government has described Jersey as a "self-governing, democratic country with the power of self-determination".

Because Jersey is a dependency of the British Crown, King Charles III reigns in Jersey. "The Crown" is defined by the Law Officers of the Crown as the "Crown in right of Jersey". The King's representative and adviser in the island is the Lieutenant Governor of Jersey – Vice-Admiral Jerry Kyd since 8 October 2022. He is a point of contact between Jersey ministers and the UK Government and carries out some functions in relation to immigration control, deportation, naturalisation and the issue of passports.

In 1973, the Royal Commission on the Constitution set out the duties of the Crown as including: ultimate responsibility for the 'good government' of the Crown Dependencies; ratification of island legislation by Order-in-Council (royal assent); international representation, subject to consultation with the island authorities before concluding any agreement which would apply to them; ensuring the islands meet their international obligations; and defence.

Legislature and government 
Jersey's unicameral legislature is the States Assembly. It includes 49 elected members: 8 senators (elected on an island-wide basis), 12 Connétables (often called 'constables', heads of parishes) and 29 deputies (representing constituencies), all elected for four-year terms as from the October 2011 elections. Jersey has one of the lowest voter turnouts internationally, with just 33% of the electorate voting in 2005, putting it well below the 77% European average for that year.

From the 2022 elections, the role of Senators will be abolished and the eight senators replaced with an increased number of deputies. The 37 deputies will be elected from nine super constituencies, rather than in individual parishes, as they are now. Although efforts were made the remove the Connétables, they will continue their historic role as States members.

There are also five non-voting members appointed by the Crown: the Bailiff, the Lieutenant Governor of Jersey, the Dean of Jersey, the Attorney General and Solicitor General. The Bailiff is President (presiding officer) of the States Assembly, head of the judiciary and as civic head of the island carries out various ceremonial roles.

The Council of Ministers, consisting of a Chief Minister and nine ministers, makes up the leading body of the Government of Jersey. Each minister may appoint up to two assistant ministers. A Chief Executive is head of the civil service. Some governmental functions are carried out in the island's parishes.

Law 

Jersey is a distinct jurisdiction for the purposes of conflict of laws, separate from the other Channel Islands, England and Wales, Scotland and Northern Ireland.

Jersey law has been influenced by several different legal traditions, in particular Norman customary law, English common law and modern French civil law. Jersey's legal system is therefore described as 'mixed' or 'pluralistic', and sources of law are in French and English languages, although since the 1950s the main working language of the legal system is English.

The principal court is the Royal Court, with appeals to the Jersey Court of Appeal and, ultimately, to the Judicial Committee of the Privy Council. The Bailiff is head of the judiciary; the Bailiff and the Deputy Bailiff are appointed by the Crown. Other members of the island's judiciary are appointed by the Bailiff.

External relations 

The external relations of Jersey are overseen by the External Relations Minister of the Government of Jersey. In 2007, the Chief Minister and the UK Lord Chancellor signed an agreement that established a framework for the development of the international identity of Jersey.

Although diplomatic representation is reserved to the Crown, Jersey has been developing its own international identity over recent years. It negotiates directly with foreign governments on various matters, for example Tax information exchange agreements (TIEAs) have been signed directly by the island with several countries. The Government maintains offices (some in partnership with Guernsey) in Caen, London and Brussels.

Jersey is a member of the British-Irish Council, the Commonwealth Parliamentary Association and the Assemblée parlementaire de la Francophonie.

Jersey Independence has in the past been discussed in the States Assembly. Former External Relations Minister Sir Philip Bailhache has at various times warned that the island may need to go independent. It is not Jersey Government policy to seek independence, but the island is prepared if it needed to do so.

Jersey is a third-party European country to the EU. Since 1 January 2021, Jersey has been part of the UK-EU Trade and Economic Cooperation Agreement for the purposes of goods and fishing. Goods exported from the island into Europe are not subject to tariffs and Jersey is solely responsible for management of its territorial waters, however permits may be granted to EU fishermen who have a history of fishing in the Bailiwick's waters. The management of this permit system has caused tension between the French and Jersey authorities, with the French threatening to cut off Jersey's electricity supply in May 2021. Before the end of the transition period after the UK withdrew from the EU in 2020, Jersey had a special relationship with the EU. It was part of the EU customs union and there was free movement of goods between Jersey and the EU but the single market in financial services and free movement of people did not apply to Jersey.

Administrative divisions 

Jersey is divided into twelve parishes (which have civil and religious functions). They are all named after their parish church. The Connétable is the head of the parish. They are elected at island general elections and sit ex oficio in the States Assembly.

The parishes have various civil administrative functions, such as roads (managed by the Road Committee) and policing (through the Honorary Police). Each parish is governed through direct democracy at Parish Assemblies, consisting of all eligible voters resident in the parish. The Procureurs du Bien Public are the legal and financial representatives of these parishes.

The parishes of Jersey are further divided into vingtaines (or, in St. Ouen, cueillettes).

Geography 

It is the largest and southernmost of the Channel Islands and part of the British Isles, with a maximum land elevation of 143 m (469 ft) above sea level.

About 24% of the island is built-up. 52% of the land area is dedicated to cultivation and around 18% is the natural environment.

The island is divided into twelve parishes; the largest is St Ouen and the smallest is St Clement. The island is characterised by a number of valleys which generally run north-to-south, such as Waterworks Valley, Grands Vaux, Mont les Vaux, although a few run in other directions, such as Le Mourier Valley.

There are several smaller island groups that are part of the Bailiwick of Jersey, such as Les Minquiers and Les Écrehous, however unlike the smaller islands of the Bailiwick of Guernsey, none of these are permanently inhabited.

Settlements 
The largest settlement is the town of St Helier, including the built-up area of southern St Helier and neighbouring areas such as Georgetown, which also plays host to the island's seat of government. The town is the central business district, hosting a large proportion of the island's retail and employment, such as the finance industry.

Outside of the town, many islanders live in suburban and rural settlements, especially along main roads leading out of town and even the more rural areas of the island have considerable amounts of development (St Ouen, the least densely populated parish still has 270 persons per square kilometre). The south and east coasts from St Aubin to Gorey are largely urbanised. The second smaller urban area is the Les Quennevais area in St Brelade, which is home to a small precinct of shops, a school, a park and a leisure centre.

Most people across Jersey regularly travel from the rural settlements to St Helier and from the town to the rural areas for work and leisure purposes.

Housing costs in Jersey are very high. The Jersey House Price Index has at least doubled between 2002 and 2020. The mix-adjusted house price for Jersey is £567,000, higher than any UK region (UK average: £249,000) including London (average: £497,000; highest of any UK region).

Climate 
The climate is an oceanic climate with mild winters and mild to warm summers. The highest temperature recorded was 37.9 °C (100.2 °F) on 18 July 2022, and the lowest temperature recorded was −10.3 °C (13.5 °F) on 5 January 1894. 2014 was the warmest year on record; the mean daily air temperature was 13.34 °C. For tourism advertising, Jersey often claims to be "the sunniest place in the British Isles", which is true as Jersey has 342 hours of sunlight more than any place in the UK. In 2011, Jersey received controversy for calling itself "the warmest place in Britain" during an advertising campaign. The Council of the Isles of Scilly argues that it is the warmest place in the UK, and that Jersey is not part of Britain.

Economy 

Jersey's economy is highly developed and services-focused, with a GDP per capita of £45,320 in 2019. It is a mixed market economy, with free market principles and an advanced social security infrastructure. 53,460 people were employed in Jersey : 24% in financial and legal services; 16% in wholesale and retail trades; 16% in the public sector; 10% in education, health and other private sector services; 10% in construction and quarrying; 9% in hotels, restaurants and bars.

Thanks to specialisation in a few high-return sectors, at purchasing power parity Jersey has high economic output per capita, substantially ahead of all of the world's large developed economies. Gross national income in 2009 was £3.7 billion (approximately £40,000 per head of population). However, this is not indicative of each individual resident's purchasing power and the actual standard of living in Jersey is comparable to that in the UK outside central London.

Jersey is one of the world's largest offshore finance centres. The UK acts as a conduit for financial services between European countries and the island. The growth of this sector however has not been without its controversies as Jersey has been characterised by critics and detractors as a place in which the "leadership has essentially been captured by global finance, and whose members will threaten and intimidate anyone who dissents."

Tourism is an important economic sector for the island, however travel to Jersey is very seasonal. Accommodation occupancy is much higher in the summer months, especially August, than in the winter months (with a low in November). The majority of visitors to the island arrive by air from the UK. On 18 February 2005, Jersey was granted Fairtrade Island status.

In 2017, 52% of the Island's area was agricultural land (a decrease since 2009). Major agricultural products are potatoes and dairy produce. Jersey cattle are a small breed of cow widely known for their rich milk and cream; the quality of their meat is also appreciated on a small scale. The herd total in 2009 was 5,090 animals. Fisheries and aquaculture make use of Jersey's marine resources to a total value of over £6 million in 2009.

Along with Guernsey, Jersey has its own lottery called the Channel Islands Lottery, which was launched in 1975.

Taxation 

Jersey is not a tax-free jurisdiction. Taxes are levied on properties (known as 'rates') and a Personal Income Tax, Corporate Income Tax and goods and services tax exist. Before 2008, Jersey had no value-added tax (VAT). Many companies, such as Amazon and Play.com, took advantage of this and a loophole in European law, known as low-value consignment relief, to establish a tax-free fulfilment industry from Jersey. This loophole was closed by the European Union in 2012, resulting in the loss of hundreds of jobs.

There is a 20% standard rate for Income Tax and a 5% standard rate for GST. The island has a 0% default tax rate for corporations; however, higher rates apply to financial services, utility companies and large corporate retailers. Jersey is considered to be a tax haven. The island, until March 2019, was on the EU tax haven blacklist, but no longer features. In January 2021, the chair of the EU Tax Matters Subcommittee, Paul Tang, criticised the list for not including such "renowned tax havens" as Jersey. In 2020, Tax Justice ranked Jersey as the 16th on the Financial Secrecy Index, below larger countries such as the UK, however still placing at the lower end of the 'extreme danger zone' for offshore secrecy'. The island accounts of 0.46% of the global offshore finance market, making a small player in the total market. In 2020, the Corporate Tax Haven Index ranked Jersey eighth for 2021 with an haven score (a measure of the jurisdiction's systems to be used for corporate tax abuse) of 100 out of 100; however, the island only has 0.51% on the Global Scale Weight ranking.

Transport 

The primary mode of transport on the island is the motor vehicle. Jersey has a large network of lanes, some of which are classified as green lanes, which have a 15 mph speed limit and where priority is afforded to pedestrians, cyclists and horse riders.

The public bus network in Jersey has been regulated by the Government since 2002, replacing a de-regulated, commercial service. It is operated on a sole-operator franchise model, currently contracted to LibertyBus, a company owned by Kelsian Group. LibertyBus also operate the school bus services. There is also a taxi network and an electronic bike scheme (EVie). Jersey has an airport and a number of ports, which are operated by Ports of Jersey.

Currency 

Jersey's monetary policy is linked to the Bank of England. The official currency of Jersey is the pound sterling. Jersey issues its own postage stamps, banknotes (including a £1 note which is not issued in the UK) and coins that circulate alongside all other sterling coinage. Jersey currency is not legal tender outside Jersey; however it is "acceptable tender" in the UK and can be surrendered at banks in exchange for UK currency.

In July 2014, the Jersey Financial Services Commission approved the establishment of the world's first regulated Bitcoin fund, at a time when the digital currency was being accepted by some local businesses.

Demography 

Censuses have been undertaken in Jersey since 1821. In the 2021 census, the total resident population was estimated to be 103,267, of whom 35% live in Saint Helier, the island's only town. Approximately half the island's population was born in Jersey; 29% of the population were born elsewhere in the British Isles, 8% in continental Portugal or Madeira, 9% in other European countries and 5% elsewhere.

Nationality and citizenship 
Jersey people are the native nation on the island, however do not form a majority of the population. Jersey people are often called Islanders or, in individual terms, Jerseyman or Jerseywoman. Jersey people did not generally identify themselves as English prior to the Union of Britain. Jersey was culturally and geographically much closer to Normandy and there were limited cross-Channel links. However, wars with France, including invasions of Jersey, grew loyalty to Britain over time and the French came more and more to be seen as a distinct people. By the start of the 19th century, Jersey people generally identified as British, which can be seen through the treatment of the Breton immigrants of the time as a distinct nation. Furthermore, the growth of the British migrant population strengthened the role of English and the British cultural influence. Finally, the introduction of compulsory education - which was exclusively in English - and the period of the Occupation reduced the traditional and Norman cultural influences and increased British cultural practices and pride in British nationhood among the island population.

Nationality law in Jersey is conferred by the British Nationality Act 1981 extended to the island by an Order in Council with the consent of the States of Jersey. British nationality law confers British citizenship onto those with suitable connections to Jersey. The Lieutenant Governor's office issues British passports (specifically the Jersey variant) to British citizens with a connection to Jersey by residency or birth.

Immigration 
Jersey is constitutionally entitled to restrict immigration by non-Jersey residents, but control of immigration at the point of entry cannot be introduced for British, certain Commonwealth and EEA nationals without change to existing international law.

Jersey is part of the Common Travel Area (CTA), a border control-free zone which encompasses the Crown Dependencies, the United Kingdom and the Republic of Ireland. This means a passport is not required to travel from Jersey to any of these territories (or vice versa) though the Government recommends all travellers bring photo ID since it may need to be checked by customs or police officers and is generally required by commercial transport providers into the island. Due to the CTA, Jersey-born British citizens in the rest of the CTA and British and Irish citizens in Jersey have the right to access social benefits, access healthcare, access social housing support and to vote in general elections.

For non-CTA travel, Jersey maintains its own immigration and border controls (although most travel into the Bailiwick is from the rest of the CTA), however UK immigration legislation may be extended to Jersey (subject to exceptions and adaptations) following consultation with Jersey and with Jersey's consent.

To control population, Jersey operates a system of registration which restricts the right to live and work in the island according to certain requirements. In order to move to Jersey or work in Jersey, everyone (including Jersey-born people) must be registered and have a registration card. There are a number of statuses:

History of immigration 
Until the 19th centuries, there was generally limited immigration to the island, especially from English people. Jersey was a distant territory to the British mainland (taking days to travel between England and the islands) and culturally distinct (the locals predominantly speaking Norman French). However, from the 16th to 19th centuries, Jersey became home to French religious refugees, particularly Protestants following the Edict of Nantes.

From the early 19th century, the island's economic boom attracted economic migrants. By 1841, of the 47,544 population, 11,338 were born in the British Isles outside of Jersey. From the 1840s onwards, agricultural workers came from neighbouring Brittany and mainland Normandy, both due to the booming economy of Jersey and the economic situation in northern France. Furthermore, the new potato season coincided with the time of least agricultural activity in Brittany and Normandy. While many returned to France, some settled in the island.

Between 1851 and 1921, the Jersey population fell by 12.8% (possibly up to 18%). The economic boom ended in the 1850s leading to significant emigration, including on to British colonies. A 1901 report by the States concluded that by 1921, the number of births to foreign-born fathers would be equal to those to Jersey-born fathers, describing the immigration situation as a 'formidable invasion, although peaceful', and predicted this would have a large impact on the island's socio-political situation.

After World War II, when the island had only 55,244 residents, it saw a period of rapid population increase. By 1991, the population was 84,082. The booming tourism industry required a large volume of relatively low cost labour, so the island turned to Madeira for seasonal staff. Between 1961 and 1981, the Portuguese-born population grew 0.2% to 3.1% of the population. In 2021, this figure was 8%. Since the fall of the Berlin Wall, the new source of cheap labour for the island has been Polish people, whose population has grown from non-existent to 3%.

Immigration has helped give aspects of Jersey a distinct urban character, particularly in and around the parish of St Helier, which contributes much to ongoing debates between development and sustainability throughout the island.

Religion 

Jersey's patron saint is St Helier, after whom the capital town is named. From the fifth century, the island was under the Bishop of Coutances, until being transferred to the Diocese of Winchester in 1568. As of 2022, the island is planned to be transferred to the Diocese of Salisbury. The established church is the Church of England, presided over in the island by the Dean, who is ex officio a States Member, but has no vote. The primary churches are the parish churches, which are 12 ancient Anglican churches in each of the parish centre, though other churches do exist.

According to a 2015 survey of islanders, 54% of adults have a religion. Christianity is the predominant religion in the island, with over half of islanders identifying as Christian in some form. The largest religious group is Anglicans, with 23% of the population.

Culture

Cultural events 
The island is particularly famous for the Battle of Flowers, a carnival held annually since 1902. Other festivals include  (Christmas festival),  (cidermaking festival), the Battle of Britain air display, Weekender Music Festival, food festivals, and parish events.

Media 

BBC Radio Jersey provides a radio service, and BBC Channel Islands News provides a joint television news service with Guernsey. ITV Channel Television is a regional ITV franchise shared with the Bailiwick of Guernsey but with its headquarters in Jersey. Radio services are also provided by Channel 103, among other companies.

Bailiwick Express is one of Jersey's digital online news sources. Jersey has only one newspaper, the Jersey Evening Post, which is printed six days a week, and has been in publication since 1890.

Music 

Little is known of the history of music in the islands, though fieldwork has recorded folk songs from the Channel Islands, mostly in French. The folk song  is unique to the island.

In contemporary music, Guru Josh, who was born in Jersey, produced house and techno music. He was most notable for his internationally successful debut hit Infinity and its re-releases, reaching number one in numerous European countries. Furthermore, rock and pop artist Nerina Pallot was raised on the island and has enjoyed international success, and has written songs for famous artists like Kylie Minogue.

The island has a summer music festival scene stretching from mid-June to late September including Good Vibrations, Out-There, the Weekender (the largest festival in the Channel Islands) and Electric Park.

Theatre 

There are two theatres on the island: the Jersey Opera House and the Jersey Arts Centre. Lillie Langtry is probably the most famous actress from the island. She was born in Jersey and became an actress on the West End in the late 19th century. She was the first socialite to appear on stage and the first celebrity to endorse a commercial product. She was also famous for her relationships with notable figures, including the Prince of Wales, later Edward VII. She is buried in St Saviour's Church graveyard.

Cinema 
In 1909, T. J. West established the first cinema in the Royal Hall in St. Helier, which became known as West's Cinema in 1923 and was demolished in 1977. The first talking picture, The Perfect Alibi, was shown on 30 December 1929 at the Picture House in St. Helier. The Jersey Film Society was founded on 11 December 1947 at the Café Bleu, West's Cinema. The large Art Deco Forum Cinema was opened in 1935 – during the German occupation this was used for German propaganda films.

The Odeon Cinema was opened 2 June 1952 and, was later rebranded in the early 21st century as the Forum cinema. Its owners, however, struggled to meet tough competition from the Cineworld Cinemas group, which opened a 10 screen multiplex on the waterfront centre in St. Helier on reclaimed land in December 2002 and the Odeon closed its doors in late 2008. The Odeon is now a listed building.

First held in 2008, the Branchage Jersey International Film Festival attracts filmmakers from all over the world.
The 2001 movie The Others was set on the island in 1945 shortly after liberation.

Food and drink 

Seafood has traditionally been important to the cuisine of Jersey: mussels (called  in the island), oysters, lobster and crabs – especially spider crabs – ormers and conger.

Jersey milk being very rich, cream and butter have played a large part in insular cooking. Jersey Royal potatoes are the local variety of new potato, and the island is famous for its early crop of Chats (small potatoes) from the south-facing côtils (steeply sloping fields). They were originally grown using vraic as a natural fertiliser, giving them their own individual taste; only a small portion of those grown in the island still use this method. They are eaten in a variety of ways, often simply boiled and served with butter or when not as fresh fried in butter.

Apples historically were an important crop.  are apple dumplings, but the most typical speciality is black butter, a dark spicy spread prepared from apples, cider and spices. Cider used to be an important export. After decline and near-disappearance in the late 20th century, apple production is being increased and promoted. Besides cider, apple brandy is produced. Other production of alcohol drinks includes wine, and in 2013 the first commercial vodkas made from Jersey Royal potatoes were marketed.

Among other traditional dishes are cabbage loaf, Jersey wonders, fliottes, bean crock, nettle soup, and vraic buns.

Sport 

In its own right Jersey participates in the Commonwealth Games and in the biennial Island Games, which it first hosted in 1997 and more recently in 2015.

The Jersey Football Association supervises football in Jersey. As of 2022, the Jersey Football Combination has nine teams in its top division. Jersey national football team plays in the annual Muratti competition against the other Channel Islands. Rugby union in Jersey comes under the auspices of the Jersey Rugby Association (JRA), which is a member of the Rugby Football Union of England. Jersey Reds compete in the English rugby union system; after four promotions in five seasons, the last three of which were consecutive, they competed in the second-level RFU Championship in 2012–13. Jersey is an associate member of the International Cricket Council (ICC). The Jersey cricket team plays in the Inter-insular match, as well as in ICC tournaments around the world in One Day Internationals and Twenty20 Internationals.

For Horse racing, Les Landes Racecourse can be found at Les Landes in St. Ouen next to the ruins of Grosnez Castle.

Jersey has two public indoor swimming pools: AquaSplash, St Helier and Les Quennevais, St Brelade. Swimming in the sea, windsurfing and other marine sports are practised. Jersey Swimming Club has organised an annual swim from Elizabeth Castle to Saint Helier Harbour for over 50 years. A round-island swim is a major challenge: the record for the swim is Ross Wisby, who circumnavigated the island in 9 hours 26 minutes in 2015. The Royal Channel Island Yacht Club is based in St Brelade.

Two professional golfers from Jersey have won the Open Championship seven times between them; Harry Vardon won six times and Ted Ray won once, both around the turn of the 20th century. Vardon and Ray also won the U.S. Open once each. Harry Vardon's brother, Tom Vardon, had wins on various European tours.

Jersey Sport, an independent body that promotes sports in Jersey and support clubs, was launched in 2017

Languages 
Until the 19th century, indigenous Jèrriais – a variety of Norman – was the language of the island though French was used for official business. During the 20th century, British cultural influence saw an intense language shift take place and Jersey today is predominantly English-speaking. Jèrriais nonetheless survives; around 2,600 islanders (three percent) are thought to be habitual speakers, and some 10,000 (12 percent) in all claim some knowledge of the language, particularly amongst the elderly in rural parishes. There have been efforts to revive Jèrriais in schools.

The dialects of Jèrriais differ in phonology and, to a lesser extent, lexis between parishes, with the most marked differences to be heard between those of the west and east. Many place names are in Jèrriais, and French and English place names are also to be found. Anglicisation of the place names increased apace with the migration of English people to the island.

Literature 

Wace was a 12th-century poet born in Jersey. He is the earliest known Jersey writer, authoring Roman de Brut and Roman de Rou, among others. Some believe him to be the earliest Jèrriais writer and he is known as the founder of Jersey literature, but the language in which he wrote is very different from modern Jèrriais.

As Jèrriais was not an official language in Jersey, it had no standard written form, which meant that Jersey literature is very varied, written in multiple forms of Jèrriais alongside Standard English and French.

Matthew Le Geyt was the first poet to publish in Jèrriais after the introduction of printing to the island in the 18th century. Philippe Le Sueur Mourant wrote in Jèrriais in the 19th century. Jerseyman George d'la Forge is named the 'Guardian of the Jersey Norman Heritage'. Though he lived in America for most of his life, he felt a strong attachment to Jersey and his native language. His works were turned into books in the 1980s.

After the failure of the 1848 revolution, thirty-nine French revolutionaries were exiled in Jersey, including the famous French author Victor Hugo, as Jersey's culture was closer to their native French. Gerald Durrell, the famous zoologist who set up Jersey Zoo, was also an author, writing novels, non-fiction and children's books. He was writing as a means to fund and further his conservation work.

Education 

Education in the island is managed by the Department for Children, Young People, Education and Skills of the Government of Jersey. The education system in Jersey is based on the English system. Full time education is compulsory for children aged 5 to 16. Furthermore, the Government provides limited pre-school education free to parents. Jersey schools must teach the Jersey Curriculum, which is based on the English National Curriculum, with differences to account for Jersey's unique position.

As of 2022, there are 24 States primary schools, seven private primary or preparatory schools, four comprehensive States secondary schools, two fee-paying States secondary schools, two private secondary schools and one provided grammar school and sixth form. Furthermore, Highlands College provides alternative post-16 and all post-18 education available on the island. However, higher education facilities are limited, so many students study off-island. In the UK, Jersey students pay the same rate as Home students.

Environment 

Three areas of land are protected for their ecological or geological interest as Sites of Special Interest (SSI). Jersey has four designated Ramsar sites: Les Pierres de Lecq, Les Minquiers, Les Écréhous and Les Dirouilles and the south east coast of Jersey (a large area of intertidal zone).

Jersey is the home of the Jersey Zoo (formerly known as the Durrell Wildlife Park) founded by the naturalist, zookeeper and author Gerald Durrell.

Biodiversity 
Four species of small mammal are considered native: the wood mouse (Apodemus sylvaticus), the Jersey bank vole (Myodes glareolus caesarius), the lesser white-toothed shrew (Crocidura suaveolens) and the French shrew (Sorex coronatus). Three wild mammals are well-established introductions: the rabbit (introduced in the mediaeval period), the red squirrel and the hedgehog (both introduced in the 19th century). The stoat (Mustela erminea) became extinct in Jersey between 1976 and 2000. The green lizard (Lacerta bilineata) is a protected species of reptile; Jersey is its only native habitat in the British Isles.

The red-billed chough (Pyrrhocorax pyrrhocorax) became extinct in Jersey around 1900, when changes in farming and grazing practices led to a decline in the coastal slope habitat required by this species. Birds on the Edge, a project between the Government of Jersey, Durrell Wildlife Conservation Trust and National Trust for Jersey, is working to restore Jersey's coastal habitats and reinstate the red-billed chough (and other bird species) to the island

Jersey is the only place in the British Isles where the agile frog (Rana dalmatina) is found. The remaining population of agile frogs on Jersey is very small and is restricted to the south west of the island. The species is the subject of an ongoing programme to save it from extinction in Jersey via a collaboration between the Government of Jersey, Durrell Wildlife Conservation Trust and Jersey Amphibian and Reptile Group (JARG), with support and sponsorship from several other organisations. The programme includes captive breeding and release, public awareness and habitat restoration activities.

Trees generally considered native are the alder (Alnus glutinosa), silver birch (Betula pendula), sweet chestnut (Castanea sativa), hazel (Corylus avellana), hawthorn (Crataegus monogyna), beech (Fagus sylvatica), ash (Fraxinus excelsior), aspen (Populus tremula), wild cherry (Prunus avium), blackthorn (Prunus spinosa), holm oak (Quercus ilex), oak (Quercus robur), sallow (Salix cinerea), elder (Sambucus nigra), elm (Ulmus spp.) and medlar (Mespilus germanica). Among notable introduced species, the cabbage palm (Cordyline australis) has been planted in coastal areas and may be seen in many gardens.

Notable marine species include the ormer, conger, bass, undulate ray, grey mullet, ballan wrasse and garfish. Marine mammals include the bottlenosed dolphin and grey seal.

Historically the island has given its name to a variety of overly-large cabbage, the Jersey cabbage, also known as Jersey kale or cow cabbage.

Japanese knotweed (Reynoutria japonica) is an invasive species that threatens Jersey's biodiversity. It is easily recognisable and has hollow stems with small white flowers that are produced in late summer. Other non-native species on the island include the Colorado beetle, burnet rose and oak processionary moth.

Public services

Healthcare 

Health services on the island are overseen by the Department for Health and Social Care. Jersey does not have a nationalised health service and the service is not part of the National Health Service. Many healthcare treatments are not free at the point of use, however treatment in the accident and emergency department is free. For residents, prescriptions and some hospital treatments are free, however GP services cost money.

Emergency services 
Emergency services are provided by the States of Jersey Police with the support of the Honorary Police as necessary, States of Jersey Ambulance Service, Jersey Fire and Rescue Service and the Jersey Coastguard. The Jersey Fire and Rescue Service, Jersey Lifeboat Association and the Royal National Lifeboat Institution operate an inshore rescue and lifeboat service; Channel Islands Air Search provides rapid response airborne search of the surrounding waters.

The States of Jersey Fire Service was formed in 1938 when the States took over the Saint Helier Fire Brigade, which had been formed in 1901. The first lifeboat was equipped, funded by the States, in 1830. The RNLI established a lifeboat station in 1884. Border security and customs controls are undertaken by the States of Jersey Customs and Immigration Service. Jersey has adopted the 112 emergency number alongside its existing 999 emergency number.

Supply services 
Water supplies in Jersey are managed by Jersey Water. Jersey Water supply water from two water treatment works, around 7.2 billion litres in 2018. Water in Jersey is almost exclusively from rainfall-dependent surface water. The water is collected and stored in six reservoirs and there is also a desalination plant that produces up to 10.8 million litres per day (around half of the Island's average daily usage). In 2017, 101 water pollution incidents were reported, an increase of 5% on 2016. Another estimated 515,700 m3 of water is abstracted for domestic purposes from private sources (around 9% of the population).

Electricity in Jersey is provided by a sole supplier, Jersey Electricity, of which the States of Jersey is the majority shareholder. Jersey imports 95 per cent of its power from France. 35% of the imported power derives from hydro-electric sources and 65% from nuclear sources. Jersey Electricity claims the carbon intensity of its electricity supply is 35g CO2 e / kWh compared to 352g CO2 e / kWh in the UK.

Notable people

See also

Notes

References

Further reading 

 Balleine's History of Jersey, Marguerite Syvret and Joan Stevens (1998) 
 Jersey Through the Centuries, Leslie Sinel, Jersey 1984, 
 A Biographical Dictionary of Jersey, G.R. Balleine

Archaeology 
 The Archaeology of the Channel Islands. Vol. 2: The Bailiwick of Jersey by Jacquetta Hawkes (1939)
 The Prehistoric Foundations of Europe to the Mycenean Age, 1940, C. F. C. Hawkes
 Jersey in Prehistory, Mark Patton, 1987
 The Archaeology and Early History of the Channel Islands, Heather Sebire, 2005.
 Dolmens of Jersey: A Guide, James Hibbs (1988).
 A Guide to The Dolmens of Jersey, Peter Hunt, Société Jersiaise, 1998.
 Statements in Stone: Monuments and Society in Neolithic Brittany, Mark Patton, 1993
 Hougue Bie, Mark Patton, Warwick Rodwell, Olga Finch, 1999
 The Channel Islands, An Archaeological Guide, David Johnston, 1981
 The Archaeology of the Channel Islands, Peter Johnston, 1986

Cattle 
 One Hundred Years of the Royal Jersey Agricultural and Horticultural Society 1833–1933. Compiled from the Society's Records, by H.G. Shepard, Secretary. Eric J. Boston. Jersey Cattle, 1954

Religion 
 The Channel Islands under Tudor Government, A.J. Eagleston
 Reformation and Society in Guernsey, D.M. Ogier
 International Politics and the Establishment of Presbyterianism in the Channel Islands: The Coutances Connection, C.S.L. Davies
 Religion, History and G.R. Balleine: The Reformation in Jersey, by J. St John Nicolle, The Pilot Magazine
 The Reformation in Jersey: The Process of Change over Two centuries, J. St John Nicolle
 The Chroniques de Jersey in the light of contemporary documents, BSJ, AJ Eagleston
 The Portrait of Richard Mabon, BSJ, Joan Stevens

External links 

 gov.je Official Government of Jersey website
 Visit Jersey Government owned tourism website
 Jerripedia Online history and family history encyclopedia
 Vote.je Elections in Jersey
 Jersey. The World Factbook. Central Intelligence Agency.
 Locate Jersey
 Jersey, from the BBC News
 Jersey Evening Post
 Prehistoric Jersey
 JerseyShops.co.uk  – local retailers

 
Bailiwick of Jersey
Crown Dependencies
English-speaking countries and territories
French-speaking countries and territories
States and territories established in 1204
Islands of the Channel Islands
British Islands
Dependent territories in Europe
Ramsar sites in Jersey
Island countries
Northwestern European countries